The 1975–76 Honduran Liga Nacional season was the 10th edition of the Honduran Liga Nacional.  The format of the tournament consisted of a three round-robin schedule followed by a 4-team playoff round.  C.D. España won the title after defeating Club Deportivo Olimpia in the finals. Both teams qualified to the 1976 CONCACAF Champions' Cup.

1975–76 teams

 Atlántida (La Ceiba, promoted)
 Broncos (Choluteca)
 España (San Pedro Sula)
 Federal (Tegucigalpa)
 Marathón (San Pedro Sula)
 Motagua (Tegucigalpa)
 Olimpia (Tegucigalpa)
 Platense (Puerto Cortés)
 Universidad (Tegucigalpa)
 Vida (La Ceiba)

Regular season

Standings

Final round

Cuadrangular standings

Final

Top scorer
  Marco Tulio "Coyol" López (Olimpia) with 11 goals

Squads

Trivia
 Atlántida from La Ceiba made only 11 points in 27 games, being this the worst record in Liga Nacional up to date.

Known results

Round 1

Round 11

Cuadrangular

Final playoff

Unknown rounds

References

Liga Nacional de Fútbol Profesional de Honduras seasons
1
Honduras